Kim Young-ok (born 13 September 1966) is a South Korean speed skater. She competed in three events at the 1988 Winter Olympics.

References

1966 births
Living people
South Korean female speed skaters
Olympic speed skaters of South Korea
Speed skaters at the 1988 Winter Olympics
Place of birth missing (living people)
Speed skaters at the 1986 Asian Winter Games
20th-century South Korean women